Andrew Johnston ( – 24 August 1862)
was an abolitionist and Whig politician in Scotland. His wife was Priscilla Buxton.

Life
Johnston was elected in 1831 as a Member of Parliament (MP) for the Anstruther District of Burghs, and when that constituency was abolished by the Reform Act 1832 he was elected at the 1832 general election for the new St Andrews District of Burghs.
He held that seat until he stood down from the House of Commons at the 1837 general election.

He married Priscilla Buxton, the daughter of Sir Thomas Fowell Buxton, Bt and they had two sons and four daughters.
They were parents of MP Andrew Johnston and grandfather of designer Edward Johnston (the son of his younger son Fowell Buxton Johnston).

References

External links
 

1790s births
1862 deaths
Members of the Parliament of the United Kingdom for Fife constituencies
Members of the Parliament of the United Kingdom for Scottish constituencies
UK MPs 1831–1832
UK MPs 1832–1835
UK MPs 1835–1837
Whig (British political party) MPs for Scottish constituencies